The Kingdom of Hungary competed at the 1936 Summer Olympics in Berlin, Germany. 216 competitors, 197 men and 19 women, took part in 104 events in 21 sports.

Medalists

|  style="text-align:left; width:78%; vertical-align:top;"|

Default sort order: Medal, Date, Name

| style="text-align:left; width:22%; vertical-align:top;"|

Multiple medalists
The following competitors won multiple medals at the 1936 Olympic Games.

Athletics

Boxing

Canoeing

Cycling

Eight cyclists, all men, represented Hungary in 1936.

Individual road race
 János Bognár
 István Liszkay
 István Adorján
 Károly Nemes-Nótás

Team road race
 János Bognár
 István Liszkay
 István Adorján
 Károly Nemes-Nótás

Sprint
 Imre Győrffy

Time trial
 László Orczán

Tandem
 Miklós Németh
 Ferenc Pelvássy

Team pursuit
 István Liszkay
 Miklós Németh
 László Orczán
 Ferenc Pelvássy

Diving

Equestrian

Fencing

19 fencers, 16 men and 3 women, represented Hungary in 1936.

Men's foil
 Béla Bay
 József Hátszeghy
 Lajos Maszlay

Men's team foil
 József Hátszeghy, Lajos Maszlay, Aladár Gerevich, Béla Bay, Ottó Hátszeghy, Antal Zirczy

Men's épée
 Béla Bay
 Rezső von Bartha
 Pál Dunay

Men's team épée
 Jenő Borovszki, Tibor Székelyhidy, Béla Bay, Pál Dunay, István Bezegh-Huszágh

Men's sabre
 Endre Kabos
 Aladár Gerevich
 László Rajcsányi

Men's team sabre
 Aladár Gerevich, Tibor Berczelly, Pál Kovács, Endre Kabos, László Rajcsányi, Imre Rajczy

Women's foil
 Ilona Elek-Schacherer
 Ilona Vargha
 Erna Bogen-Bogáti

Field hockey

Preliminary round

Football

Gymnastics

Handball

Modern pentathlon

Three male pentathlete represented Hungary in 1936.

 Nándor von Orbán
 Rezső von Bartha	
 Lajos von Sipeki-von Balás

Polo

Rowing

Hungary had 23 rowers participate in seven out of seven rowing events in 1936.
 Men's single sculls
 László Kozma

 Men's double sculls
 Károly Bazini
 Egon Bazini

 Men's coxless pair
 Károly Győry
 Tibor Mamusich

 Men's coxed pair
 Károly Győry
 Tibor Mamusich
 László Molnár (cox)

 Men's coxless four
 Ferenc Dobos
 Frigyes Pabsz
 Tibor Vadai
 Gyula Halmay

 Men's coxed four
 Miklós Mihó
 Vilmos Éden
 Ákos Inotay
 Alajos Szilassy
 László Molnár (cox)

 Men's eight
 Pál Domonkos
 Sándor von Korompay
 Hugó Ballya
 Imre Kapossy
 Antal Szendey
 Gábor Alapy
 Frigyes Hollósi
 László Szabó
 Ervin Kereszthy (cox)

Sailing

Shooting

Eight shooters represented Hungary in 1936.

25 m rapid fire pistol
 László Vadnay
 Jakab Kőszegi
 Dezső von Zirthy

50 m pistol
 Sándor Tölgyesi
 Bertalan Zsótér

50 m rifle, prone
 Ralph Berzsenyi
 Zoltán Soós-Ruszka Hradetzky
 Tibor Tary

Swimming

Water polo

Weightlifting

Wrestling

Art competitions

References

External links
Official Olympic Reports
International Olympic Committee results database

Nations at the 1936 Summer Olympics
1936
1936 in Hungarian sport